Petras Dirgėla (born 21 February 1947, Klaipeda District, Lithuania; died 29 March 2015, Vilnius, Lithuania) was a Lithuanian writer, a 2003 recipient of the Lithuanian National Prize.

Bibliography
Mažas vaikelis su senelio lazda (1982), novel
Kūlgrinda (1984), historical novel
Joldijos jūra (1987), historical novel
Vėtrungiškoji dalia: Esė apie literatūrą ir gyvenimą (1986), essay book
Minijos žemė: Esė apie tėviškę (1988), essay book
Tranų pasaulis: Esė apie vaikišką meilę namams ir kapams (1990), essay book
Arkliavagio duktė, film script, together with R. Šavelis
Karalystė. Žemės keleivių epas: 
Benamių knygos (1997)
Ceremonijų knygos (2002)
Vilties pilnųjų knygos (2002)
Alibi knygos (2004)
Begalybės riba (2003) 
Arklių romansai (2005)  
Jauno faraono vynuogynuose (2006)

Together with his brother, Povilas Dirgėla
Žaibai gęsta rudenį (1971)
Pasimatymai (1973) 
Aistrų atlaidai (1979)
Likime, keliauk sau (1976)
Šalavijų kalnas (1977)
Pogodalis (1978) 
Šermenų vynas (1980).

References

1947 births
2015 deaths
Lithuanian essayists
Lithuanian male writers
Lithuanian novelists
Recipients of the Lithuanian National Prize